Agni Natchathiram is a 2019-2021  Indian Tamil- language soap opera. The series premiered on 27 May 2019 on Sun TV and ended on 3 April 2021. It airs Monday to Saturday 11:30 AM and ended with 414 episodes. The show stars Varshini Arza, Mersheena Neenu / Gayathri Raj and Vasanth  Kumar. The show is produced by Team Vision and directed by V. Solairaja and Arulrai.

Plot
The story revolves arounds two girls Akila and Meera who are polar opposites. Their fathers are friends and also master and driver to one another. Akila (Gayathri Raj) is the master's daughter and Meera (Varshini), the driver's. Unknown to them, they are actually twins of the latter. They are caught in a love triangle with Shridhar (Vasanth Vasi).

Cast

Main
 Varshini Arza as Meera Shridar, Selvam's first daughter, Shridhar 's wife
 Mersheena Neenu (2019-Aug.2020) as Akhila
 Gayathri Raj (Aug.2020-2021) as Akhila Surya , Selvam's second daughter, Meera's younger sister and Surya 's second wife
 Vasanth Vasi as Shridhar, Meera  and Akila's love interest, later Meera's husband.

Supporting
 Raj Kumar Manoharan as Surya, Shridhar's elder brother, Revathi and Akhila 's husband
Mounika/Keerthana as Jayanthi, Selvam's wife, meera and akhila's mother
Rishi Keshav as Selvam (Meera and Akila's father) 
Vinodhini / Pramodini Pammi / Shilpa Mary Teresa / Gayathri Priya as Nalini Chandrashekar, Selvam's sister, Akila's foster mother 
Bharath Kalyan as Chandrashekar, Selvam's best friend, Akila's foster father
Sri Vidhya Shankar and Dharini as Mythili (Shridhar's mother)
Murali as Karthikeyan (Surya and Shridhar's father)
Anuradha as Gangadevi (Ayyadurai's mother and Ranjith's grandmother) 
Maanas Chavali as Ranjith (Ayyadurai's son)
Baboos as Ayyadurai
Shanthi Anandaraj as Shanthi 
Naveendhar as Naveen (Shridhar's friend)
Vasavi as Chinnamani 
Uma Rani as Kanchana (Karthikeyan's cousin sister and Shridhar's aunt)
Shabnam as Revathi (Surya's first wife)
Swetha Senthilkumar as Indhu

References

External links
 
 Agni Natchathiram on Sun NXT

Sun TV original programming
Television shows set in Tamil Nadu
2019 Tamil-language television series debuts
Tamil-language television shows
Tamil-language romance television series
Tamil-language melodrama television series
2021 Tamil-language television series endings